Pchelarovo is a village in Chernoochene Municipality, in Kardzhali Province, in southern-central Bulgaria. It covers an area of 25.645 square kilometres and as of 2007 it had a population of 175 people.

Population
According to the census of 2011, the village of Pchelarovo has 142 inhabitants, down from its peak of 1,107 people shortly after the Second World War. The village is exclusively inhabited by ethnic  Bulgarians (99%).

References

Villages in Kardzhali Province